Samuel Nicoll Benjamin (January 3, 1839 – May 15, 1886) was a Union Army officer during the American Civil War who received the Medal of Honor.

Early life
Benjamin was born on January 3, 1839, in New York City. He was the son of William Massena Benjamin (1800–1862) and Sarah Jane (née Turk) Benjamin (1805–1903). His siblings included Edith Massena Benjamin, Sarah Josephine Benjamin Arnold, and Laura Gertrude Benjamin Brooks.

Benjamin graduated from the United States Military Academy at West Point with the class of 1861.

Career
During the American Civil War, he fought in the Battle of Blackburn's Ford, the First Battle of Bull Run, the Peninsular Campaign, the Northern Virginia Campaign, the Maryland Campaign, the Battle of Fredericksburg, the Vicksburg Campaign, the East Tennessee Campaign, and the Overland Campaign, including both the Battle of the Wilderness and the Battle of Spotsylvania Court House.

Following the Civil War, he served at West Point and in the Adjutant General Corps.

Medal of Honor citation
He received his Medal of Honor on June 11, 1877, for his service from Bull Run to Spotsylvania, Va. over the period from July 1861 to May 1864.  The citation stated: "Particularly distinguished services as an artillery officer." His rank and organization were First Lieutenant, 2d U.S. Artillery.

Personal life
Benjamin was married to Julia Kean Fish (1841–1908). Julia was the daughter of Governor of New York, U.S. Senator, and U.S. Secretary of State Hamilton Fish (1808–1893) and Julia Ursin Niemcewiez Kean (1816–1887). She was also the sister of Nicholas Fish II, Hamilton Fish II, and Stuyvesant Fish. Together, they were the parents of:

 Elizabeth d'Hauteville Benjamin (1871–1884), who died young.
 William Massena Benjamin (1874–1928), who married Charlotte Hoffman Prime (1881–1969), the great-granddaughter of Nathaniel Prime, in 1903.
 Hamilton Fish Benjamin (1877–1938), a twin who married Emily Low Bacon (1884–1960) in 1909.  They divorced in 1923 and he married Ruth Wolfe (1890–1984), in 1932.
 Julian Arnold Benjamin (1877–1953), a twin.

He died on May 15, 1886, while on duty serving in the Department of the East. He is buried in the cemetery of Saint Phillip's church in Garrison, New York.

Descendants
Through his son William, he was the grandfather of Charlotte Prime Benjamin, (1904–2002), who married Richard Morris Carver in 1925; Elizabeth Fish Benjamin (1906–1976), who married William McLane in 1928; Julia Kean Benjamin (1908–1983); William Hoffman Benjamin (1910–1997); Emily Stuyvesant Benjamin (1913–2000); Samuel Nicoll Benjamin (1915–2006); Mary Benjamin; Sarah Morris Benjamin; and Hamilton Fish Benjamin II (1921–1984).

See also

List of Medal of Honor recipients
List of American Civil War Medal of Honor recipients

References
Notes

Sources

External links

1839 births
1886 deaths
Union Army officers
United States Army Medal of Honor recipients
United States Military Academy alumni
American Civil War recipients of the Medal of Honor